Kenneth Jean Georgy Maillard (born 1972) is a Mauritian accountant who is one of the principals of the Belvedere Management group.

Career
Maillard worked for the offshore department of Arthur Andersen Mauritius and other companies. He is the co-founder and managing director of Belvedere Management Limited and serves as its managing director. Since 2007 he has been a non-executive director of TransAfrika Resources Limited. Maillard is also a director of Fulhold Pharma plc subsidiary Ful Hold Ltd.

Professional affiliations
Maillard is a fellow of the Association of Chartered Certified Accountants and also an associate member of the Society of Trusts and Estate Planners.

See also
Cobus Kellermann
David Dawson Cosgrove

References

Mauritian businesspeople
Accountants
Living people
Fellows of the Association of Chartered Certified Accountants
1972 births